There are several ice hockey championships for European women, including:

 IIHF European Women Championships
 IIHF European Women's Champions Cup

cs:Mistrovství Evropy v ledním hokeji žen
da:EM i ishockey (kvinder)
fr:Championnat d'Europe de hockey sur glace féminin
ru:Чемпионат Европы по хоккею с шайбой (женщины)
fi:Jääkiekon naisten Euroopan-mestaruuskilpailut